Cherchen Man or Chärchän Man or Ur-David is the modern name given to a mummy found in the town Cherchen, located in current Xinjiang region of China. The mummy is a member of the group known as Tarim mummies. His naturally-mummified remains were discovered in Tomb 2 at the Zaghunluq cemetery, near the town of Qiemo (Chärchän) in the Taklamakan Desert of north-west China.

Like the rest of the Tarim Mummies, he is famous for European-like facial features and clothing.
It is believed that the Cherchen man like the other Tarim mummies are evidence of the Afanasievo culture's descent from the Indo-European language speakers who migrated into the Russian steppes around 3300 BC.
Other such remains have also been recovered at sites throughout the Tarim basin, including Qäwrighul, Yanghai, Shengjindian, Shanpula (Sampul), and Qizilchoqa.

Description
The mummy is an adult male who is believed to have died around 1000 BC and is likely to have been aged around fifty years at the time of his death. 

His height is estimated at 176–178 cm. His hair was "reddish brown flecked with grey, framing high cheekbones", he had an aquiline "long nose, full lips and a ginger beard", and was wearing "a red twill tunic" and leggings with a pattern resembling tartan. Yellow and purple spiral and sun patterns on the mummy's face have been misidentified as tattoos in some sources; they are actually an ochre paint.

Mummification
Like other mummies from the Tarim, Cherchen Man was buried in a tomb made of mud bricks topped with reeds and brush. The Cherchen man and the other female mummy were placed on multiple branches, with small mats underneath them that reduced the moisture in the tomb, adding to their preservation. The Cherchen man also appears to have had a piece of wood holding his legs up in the bent position which would have increased the amount of air circulation, slowing the rate of decomposition.

The Cherchen man and his companions were natural mummies meaning that unlike the well known Egyptian mummies, they became mummies from exposure to their ambient environment, as opposed to intentional human practices.

See also
 Sogdia
 Tocharians
 Western Regions
 Wusun
 Yuezhi
 Kurgan Peoples
 Human Migration

References

Links
 
 

Tarim mummies
History of Xinjiang
11th-century BC deaths